Piyush Dasgupta (Bengali: পীযূষ দাশগুপ্ত, 30 October 1922 – 8 August 2002) was an Indian academician, author, a political activist, Marxist theoretician and a life-long communist. He was a member of the Communist Party of India and remained integral to the left movement in Bengal for four decades. In 1949 in Presidency Jail, Kolkata, Dasgupta led a fifty-six-day-long hunger strike for the rights of political prisoners . In the early 1960s, when Communist Party of India (Marxist) was banned, Dasgupta was enlisted in the underground leadership along with two stalwarts of the party . A professor of economics and political science, Dasgupta was instrumental in the cause of Marxist discourse in Bengal. He was part of the editorial team of People's Democracy (newspaper), Deshhitaishee, the head of the National Book Agency and the author of multiple books and articles. One of Dasgupta’s legacies is the complete translation of ‘Das Kapital’ to Bengali . It was possibly a first in any Indian language  and was accomplished at the behest of Muzaffar Ahmad, co-founder of the Communist Party of India.

Early life and education 

Piyush Dasgupta was born on 30 October 1922 in Kotalipara, Madaripur sub-division of the Faridpur district of British India. He was the eldest son of Gangacharan Dasgupta and Suhasini Devi. He did his matriculation from Madaripur School, Intermediate of Arts (IA) from Rajendra College of Faridpur and then moved to Kolkata. Dasgupta got his bachelor's from Scottish Church College and then a masters in Economics from University of Calcutta in 1944.

Madaripur was an epicentre of freedom struggle, and Dasgupta got involved very young. He grew close to the left revolutionaries, including Anukul Chatterjee of Jugantar and became a member of ‘Sanskritik Sabhayan’ ('সাংস্কৃতিক সভায়ন'), a revolutionary organisation. In 1931 Dasgupta was brutally assaulted by the colonial police after he unfurled the tricolour on top of the Congress Bhavan in Madaripur in defiance of the district magistrate's order.

On 7 August 1941, on behalf of the Communist Party of India, Dasgupta, Annadashankar Bhattacharya, and another comrade laid a wreath on the mortal remains of Rabindranath Tagore in front of the Senate Hall of Calcutta University . Those days the party was banned by the British government, and Dasgupta was a student in Scottish Church College. It was an act of great significance — a definitive statement on how the communists viewed Tagore.

Work and legacy 

At twenty-two, Dasgupta started his career as a professor at the newly established Nabadwip Vidyasagar College. However, he was soon faced with the conservative elements of the town who opposed the introduction of modern education. Dasgupta stood his ground despite violent attacks till the opponents gave up their attempts at closing down the college. In the following years, Dasgupta taught in three other institutions – City College, Kolkata, Scottish Church College and Maharaja Manindra Chandra College. During this period, he earned the respect of students that spread beyond the boundary of his college. He was sought after as an orator, an erudite and caring teacher. Most significantly, Dasgupta emerged as a young Marxist theoretician in Bengal.

Dasgupta was arrested in 1949 after the West Bengal Government banned the Communist Party of India. He was imprisoned in Presidency Jail, Kolkata. In the jail, Dasgupta led a fifty-six-day-long hunger strike for the rights of political prisoners. 

In 1959 Dasgupta was terminated from Manindrachandra College. This was a direct consequence of his political beliefs, influence and, most importantly, his successful hunger strike against the wrongful removal of a fellow professor by the college authorities. What followed his termination was unprecedented - students went on a month-long hunger strike. The faculty joined them. In solidarity, students across West Bengal went on strike too. Finally, at the request of Nirmal Kumar Sidhanta, the vice-chancellor of Calcutta University and after his verbal assurance of withdrawal of the termination, the students agreed to end their agitation. The vice chancellor was personally present when the students and faculty broke their fast. Unfortunately, his assurance was never honoured.

Piyush Dasgupta was a polymath. Other than economics and political science, he had a deep knowledge of history, philosophy and literature and an innate ability to synthesise all. In 1960 he took over the responsibility of the National Book Agency (NBA) – a significant publishing house of the time in Kolkata. Under his stewardship, NBA became a fountainhead of Indian and foreign publications, from classical literature to history and philosophy.

In 1964 Communist Party of India split into two, and Dasgupta joined the Communist Party of India (Marxist) (CPIM). Immediately after the split, the majority of the top leaders of CPIM were imprisoned. However, it was decided to continue the struggle through an underground wing of the party with Samar Mukherjee as the secretary and revolutionary Ganesh Ghosh, Piyush Dasgupta as key members. For nearly two years, Dasgupta remained underground to sustain the party organisation and direct the movement across West Bengal . He could come out of hiding in 1966. Soon after, he fell critically ill. It took another year for him to recover. By that time, CPIM was heading for yet another split in the face of the Naxalbari movement. The bloodiest phase in post-independence Bengal had just started. Dasgupta toured towns and remote villages, speaking to his fellow party workers, building bridges with the disillusioned and reaffirming faith of those in doubt .

Other than being in charge of NBA, Piyush Dasgupta was on the editorial committee of Deshhitaishi and People's Democracy (newspaper). From the ’50s to the ’90s, his articles on economics, politics and literature appearing in publications like Mukhapatra, Nandan, Bangladesh, The Telegraph (India) and Bartaman triggered both appreciation and discussion amongst the intellectuals . However, his seminal contribution culminated over a decade from 1974 to 1983. At the behest of Muzaffar Ahmad, Dasgupta single-handedly translated the complete ‘Das Kapital’ of Karl Marx to Bengali for the first time.

Starting in the ’60s, Dasgupta was at the forefront of the West Bengal College and University Teachers Association. In 1969, he became the principal of the newly established Netaji Nagar College, Kolkata. Under his stewardship, the college quickly grew in stature and recognition.

Select Publications 

 Bharater Krishak Bidroha, National Book Agency, 1953.
 Tolstoy Prasange Lenin, National Book Agency, 1957 .
 Life of Muzaffar Ahmad on the occasion of his 74th birthday celebrations, Calcutta, National Book Agency, 1963.
 Das Capital, Bani Prakash, 1974.
 Stalin Rachanabali, Nabajatak Prakashan, 1975.
 Anyachoke Rabindranath O Bibidha Prasanga, Bani Prakash, 1988.
 Shilpa O Sahitya Prasange: Marx theke Mao, Bani Prakash, 1990.

References

Citations 

 
 
 
 
 

Communist Party of India (Marxist) politicians from West Bengal
Scottish Church College alumni
University of Calcutta alumni
Politicians from Kolkata
1922 births
2002 deaths
People from Faridpur District